The Kamthieng House Museum is a museum in Watthana District, Bangkok, run by the Siam Society under royal patronage. It is a 174-year-old traditional teakwood house from northern Thailand.

Literature

External links 
Siam Society | Kamthieng House Museum
 Kamthieng House Museum of The Siam Society at Google Cultural Institute

Museums in Bangkok
Historic house museums in Thailand